The Santa Clara University School of Law (Santa Clara Law) is the law school of Santa Clara University, a Jesuit university in Santa Clara, California, United States, in the Silicon Valley region. The School of Law was founded in 1911. The Jesuit affiliation of the university is manifested in a concern with ethics, social justice, and community service.

Santa Clara Law offers the Juris Doctor (J.D.) law degree, as well as several double-degree programs, including J.D./Master of Business Administration (J.D./M.B.A.) and J.D./Master of Science in Information Systems (MSIS) offered in conjunction with Santa Clara University's Leavey School of Business, ranked 10th in graduate programs on the U.S. News & World Report graduate schools rankings. In addition, the school offers Master of Laws (LL.M.) degrees in intellectual property law, in U.S. law for foreign lawyers, and in international and comparative law. Santa Clara Law also features specialized curricular programs in high tech and intellectual property law, international law, public interest, social justice law, and is one of few law schools to offer a certificate in privacy law. The school offers more summer study abroad programs than any other law school in the United States, with 13 different programs across 17 countries.

History
Santa Clara University School of Law was founded in 1911. The school is part of Santa Clara University (founded 1851), the oldest operating institution of higher learning in California and the oldest Catholic university in the American West. It was approved by the American Bar Association in 1937. It joined the Association of American Law Schools in 1940.

Prior to the requirement that all Californian law graduates must take the state bar exam, Santa Clara Law was one of the five schools whose graduates were exempt from the examination, along with Boalt Hall, Hastings, Stanford, and USC.

Rankings

According to the required disclosures under ABA Section 509, not counting those employed where a JD degree was an advantage, employed in a professional position, and those enrolled in graduate studies, 55% of the Class of 2021 was employed in full-time, long-term positions that require bar admission within nine months of graduation.

Law school rankings of Santa Clara Law include:
 Number 4 for Intellectual Property Law among law schools in the United States
 Number 12 for diversity among law schools (tied for first in California with the USC Law School)
 Number 126 overall of 200 ABA approved law schools in the United States as ranked by U.S. News & World Report
 Princeton Review "Best 170 Law Schools" (2008) – number 22 overall among law schools for average starting salary
 The Census Group Composition ranking, which scores law schools based on selectivity, salary, placement and yield, ranks Santa Clara Law at Number 64.
 Hylton Rankings, which scores programs based on their U.S. News & World Report peer assessment ratings provided by law professors and by the mean LSAT scores of each law school, ranked Santa Clara Law at Number 78 overall.
 Listed Number 13 overall for mid-career median salary (at $188,000 a year) in Forbes list of Best Law Schools for Getting Rich
 Graded as "B−" in the January 2011 "Best Public Interest Law Schools" listing by The National Jurist: The Magazine for Law Students
 Graded as "A" in the March 2011 "Diversity Honor Roll" by The National Jurist: The Magazine for Law Students
 Its journal, Santa Clara Computer and High Technology Law Journal, is ranked #6 nationally for intellectual property.

Bar passage rates
Based on a 2001–2007 six-year average, 73% of Santa Clara University Law graduates passed the California State Bar.

Post-graduation employment
According to Santa Clara's official 2013 ABA-required disclosures, 42.2% of the Class of 2013 obtained full-time, long-term, JD-required employment nine months after graduation, excluding solo-practitioners. Santa Clara Law's Law School Transparency under-employment score is 34.5%, indicating the percentage of the Class of 2013 unemployed, pursuing an additional degree, or working in a non-professional, short-term, or part-time job nine months after graduation.

Law School Transparency reports a 41.3% employment score for the Class of 2011.

According to the American Bar Association's "Official Guide to ABA-Approved Law Schools," 94.5 percent of Santa Clara students were employed nine months after graduation, with 77 percent of graduates employed in the private sector and 21 percent employed in the public sector.

According to the Princeton Review, the average private-sector starting salary for Santa Clara Law graduates in 2020 is $100,000. According to Forbes magazine, mid-career median salary is currently $188,000 a year.

According to a study done by online salary-information company PayScale, graduates of Santa Clara Law have the third highest midcareer median salary among all graduate programs in the United States.  The report found that Santa Clara Law graduates typically make $76,900 the first year following graduation and attain a midcareer median salary of $197,700.

Costs

The total cost of attendance (indicating the cost of tuition, fees, and living expenses) at Santa Clara for the 2021-2022 academic year was $89,444 for first-year law students. The Law School Transparency estimated debt-financed cost of attendance for three years is $262,472.

Students
For the 2021 entering class, the top-five feeder schools into Santa Clara Law were UC Berkeley, UC Davis, UC San Diego, San Jose State University, and Santa Clara University.

The top-five feeder states in order are California, Texas, Nevada, Washington, and Arizona. For the 2021 entering class, 2,336 people applied to the School of Law and 205 full-time and 21 part-time students matriculated.

For the 2021 entering class, the LSAT scores for entering full-time students were 160 for the 75th percentile and 155 for the 25th percentile. The undergraduate GPA for full-time entering students was 3.62 for the 75th percentile and 3.21 for the 25th percentile.

Santa Clara Law has a chapter of the Order of the Coif, a national law school honorary society founded for the purposes of encouraging legal scholarship and advancing the ethical standards of the legal profession.

Campus

Amid its many Mission-style academic and residential buildings are the historic mission gardens, rose garden, and palm trees. The campus benefits from the area's mediterranean climate, with more than 300 days of sun a year.

Until 1939, the law school inhabited present-day St. Joseph's Hall at the center of campus. Under the tenure of Dean Edwin Owens, Bergin Hall was constructed and became home to the school in 1939. The new building was built using monies collected through Santa Clara football's successful appearances in the Sugar Bowl and named after Thomas Bergin, Santa Clara's first graduate, a California legal pioneer, and an early donor to the School of Law.

The Edwin Heafey Law Library was constructed in 1963, and expanded in 1973 to include more space for library materials.  Heafey was renovated and expanded again in 1988.  The collection contains over 400,000 volumes in print and digital formats.  Additionally, the library manages an institutional repository which currently contains over 4,000 digital items including a collection of papers related to the Congressional hearings regarding the Watergate Scandal donated by Congressman Don Edwards.  Other digital collections include documents relating to litigation over the Patient Protection and Affordable Healthcare Act (also known as Obamacare) and the Hague Convention for the Protection of Cultural Property in the Event of Armed Conflict.

Also in 1973, Bannan Hall was built, including space for the Law School on the ground floor.  In 2008 Dean Donald Polden announced the law school would have exclusive use of Bannan Hall, and the building was renovated and used exclusively by the law school shortly thereafter.

In 2018, the Law school moved into Charney Hall, a new $60-million building built specifically to house the Law school. The 96,000-square-foot building is a vast improvement over the school's previous facilities, which were spread over very different buildings, one of which was built a century ago. In contrast, Charney Hall calls to mind the nearby Silicon Valley tech campuses thanks to copious amounts of open space, natural light, cutting-edge classroom technology, plenty of student comforts, and flexible spaces that foster collaboration and innovative teaching.

Notable faculty
 Colleen V. Chien – senior advisor for intellectual property in the White House Office of Science and Technology Policy (OSTP)
 David D. Friedman – author of The Machinery of Freedom
 Eric Goldman – Co-Director of the High Tech Law Institute, author of Technology and Marketing Law Blog
 Ro Khanna – adjunct instructor, former Deputy Assistant Secretary in the United States Department of Commerce
 Catherine Sandoval – Commissioner on the California Public Utilities Commission

Notable alumni

 Mike Espy (1978) – former 25th United States Secretary of Agriculture, Member of the U.S. House of Representatives
 Phyllis Jean Hamilton (1976) – Judge of the United States District Court for the Northern District of California
 Beth Kerttula (1981) – Minority Leader, Alaska House of Representatives
 Robert J. Lagomarsino (1953) – U.S. Representative for California's 19th District 
 Zoe Lofgren (1975) – U.S. Representative for California's 16th congressional district
 Douglas Moylan (1991) – Judge on the Supreme Court of Guam; first elected Attorney General of Guam
 Edward A. Panelli (1956) –  Justice of the Supreme Court of California
 Jimmy Panetta (1996) – U.S. Representative for California's 20th congressional district; previously assistant district attorney in Monterey County, California
 Leon Panetta (1963) – former Secretary of Defense; former Director of the Central Intelligence Agency; previously,  White House Chief of Staff under Bill Clinton; U.S. House of Representatives (California)
 Howard Wallace Pollock (1953) – U.S. Representative for Alaska
 Curren Price (1976) – Senator, California State Senate
 Albert J. Ruffo (1936) – 48th Mayor of San Jose
 Mark Stone (1988) – Assemblymember for California's 29th State Assembly district

Law School deans
Timeline of historical events, including previous deans.
 James Campbell – 1911 to 1918
 Lawrence E. O'Keefe, SJ – 1919 to 1920
 Clarence Coolidge – 1920 to 1933
 Edwin J. Owens – 1933 to 1953
 Byron J. Snow – 1953 to 1955
 Warren P. McKenney – 1955 to 1959
 Leo Huard – 1959 to 1969
 George Strong (acting) – 1970
 George Alexander – 1970 to 1985
 Richard Rykoff (acting) – 1985 to 1986
 Gerald Uelmen – 1986 to 1994
 Mack Player – 1994 to 2003
 Donald J. Polden – 2003 to 2013
 Lisa Kloppenberg – 2013 to 2019
 Anna Han (acting) – 2019 to 2021
 Michael J. Kaufman – 2021 to present

References

External links
 

 
ABA-accredited law schools in California
Catholic law schools in the United States
Educational institutions established in 1911
Santa Clara University Schools and Colleges
Law in the San Francisco Bay Area
1911 establishments in California